Jack Wayne Hall (February 28, 1915 – January 2, 1971) was an American labor organizer and trade unionist. He was the Hawaii Regional Director of the International Longshore and Warehouse Union.

Early life 
Hall was born in Ashland, Wisconsin, on February 28, 1915. When he was a child, his mother committed suicide. He was raised in Los Angeles by his grandmother. His experience traveling in Asia and witnessing poverty and the effects of colonialism led him to become a communist.

Career 
Hall's first labor strike was the 1934 West Coast waterfront strike as a member of the Sailors Union of the Pacific.

Hall arrived in Hawaii in 1935, where he wrote for a newspaper called The Voice of Labor. In 1944 he was named Hawaii's first regional director for the ILWU. He then led a drive that organized plantation and dock workers as one interracial union. Before the drive, most strikes were held by one ethnic group at a time, with the exception of the Oahu sugar strike of 1920, during which Japanese and Filipino plantation workers went on strike together. The drive ended with the ILWU having contracts with 33 out of 34 sugar plantations, and 30,000 members. This made the union very successful during strikes in the late 1940s, especially the strike in 1949 that closed Hawaiian ports for six months.

When he could not make changes with labor strikes, Hall worked politically, eventually becoming close with future Governor of Hawaii John Burns. Hall drafted the Hawaii State Employment Relations Act, which was a Hawaiian version of the Wagner Act. It was introduced in the Hawaiian Senate by J. B. Fernandez, and passed in 1945.

In August 1951 Hall and 6 other people (later called the Hawaii 7) were accused by Jack Kawano of violating the Smith Act. They were arrested and investigated by the House Un-American Activities Committee. Many in the ILWU claimed that the arrest was planned by the Big Five to interfere with the union's negotiations with the sugar companies. The Hawaii 7 were convicted on June 19, 1953. Hall was sentenced to 5 years in prison and a $5,000 fine. The charge was later overturned during an appeal to the 9th U.S. Circuit Court of Appeals. Despite this, he remained popular with the workers he unionized, though the union itself lost political influence.

Later life and death 
In 1969, Hall was promoted to International Vice President and Director of Organization for the ILWU. He moved to San Francisco, where he died of a stroke on January 2, 1971. After his death, flags were flown at half mast. Members of the ILWU and other unions stopped work for 15 minutes in the first statewide work stoppage in Hawaii's history. A documentary titled Jack Hall: his life and times was filmed about his life in 2008. The ILWU building in Honokaʻa was also named after him.

Further reading

See also 

Arthur Rutledge
Hawaii Democratic Revolution of 1954

References 

1915 births
1971 deaths
Trade unionists from Hawaii
International Longshore and Warehouse Union people
People from Ashland, Wisconsin
American communists
United States Merchant Mariners